Leucetta is a genus of sponges in the family Leucettidae, which was first described in 1872 by Ernst Haeckel. The type species is Leucetta primigenia Haeckel, 1872 by subsequent designation.

In Australia, Leucetta species are found off the coasts of New South Wales, Queensland, Victoria, and Western Australia. However, species of this genus are found worldwide.

Species
Accepted species are:
Leucetta antarctica Dendy, 1918
Leucetta avocado de Laubenfels, 1954
Leucetta chagosensis Dendy, 1913
Leucetta delicata Rapp, Göcke, Tendal & Janussen, 2013
Leucetta floridana (Haeckel, 1872)
Leucetta foliata Leocorny, Alencar, Fromont & Klautau, 2016
Leucetta gelatinosa (Jenkin, 1908)
Leucetta giribeti Riesgo, Cavalcanti, Kenny, Ríos, Cristobo & Lanna, 2018
Leucetta homoraphis (Poléjaeff, 1883)
Leucetta imberbis (Duchassaing & Michelotti, 1864)
Leucetta insignis Row & Hôzawa, 1931
Leucetta microraphis Haeckel, 1872
Leucetta potiguar Lanna, Cavalcanti, Cardoso, Muricy & Klautau, 2009
Leucetta primigenia Haeckel, 1872
Leucetta prolifera (Carter, 1878)
Leucetta purpurea Leocorny, Alencar, Fromont & Klautau, 2016
Leucetta pyriformis Dendy, 1913
Leucetta sagittata Haeckel, 1872
Leucetta solida (Schmidt, 1862)
Leucetta sulcata Van Soest & De Voogd, 2018
Leucetta trigona Haeckel, 1872
Leucetta villosa Wörheide & Hooper, 1999
Leucetta weddelliana Rapp, Janussen & Tendal, 2011

References

External links 

 Distribution of Leucetta species

Sponge genera
Taxa named by Ernst Haeckel